The 2022–23 Iraq Division Three will be the 49th season of the Iraq Division Three, the fourth tier in the Iraqi football league system, since its establishment in 1974. The number of clubs in the league have varied throughout history for various reasons; 118 clubs are set to participate in this 
year's edition. The top 38 teams in the league are promoted directly to Iraq Division Two. There is no general date for the start of the league, but each subsidiary football association chooses the best time to start the league in their region.

Teams
A total of 118 teams are competing for the league after some teams withdrew for financial reasons. The teams are originally promoted to the Iraq Division Two based on the rule of one qualified team out of every five participating teams. The number of teams that will be promoted to the Division Two will be 38 teams.

Overview 
The 118 clubs are supposed to be divided into 18 groups by location (some of these groups play in subgroups as well), and each group represents the province to which these clubs belong and lies within its borders. But there are 5 provinces that do not have clubs that play in this level.

League table

1- Dohuk Group
There are no teams in Dohuk that play in this division.

2- Nineveh Group
TBD

3- Erbil Group
There are no teams in Erbil that play in this division.

4- Kirkuk Group

Group 1

Group 2

5- Sulaymaniyah Group
There are no teams in Sulaymaniyah that play in this division.

6- Saladin Group

Group 1

Group 2

7- Al-Anbar Group

Group 1

Group 2

8- Baghdad Groups

Group 1

Group 2

Group 3

9- Diyala Group

Group 1

Group 2

10- Karbalaa Group

Group 1

Group 2

11- Babil Group

12- Wasit Groups

Group 1

Group 2

Group 3

13- Al-Najaf Group
There are no teams in Al-Najaf that play in this division.

14- Al-Qādisiyyah Group

15- Maysan Group
TBD

16- Al-Muthanna Group
There are no teams in Al-Muthanna that play in this division.

17- Dhi Qar Group
TBD

18- Basra Group
TBD

References

External links
 Iraq Football Association

2022–23 in Iraqi football
Football leagues in Iraq
Fourth level football leagues in Asia